On the Eve of Destruction: 1991–1995 is a compilation album by the Detroit, Michigan punk rock band The Suicide Machines, released in 2005 by Noise Riot Records. It collects nearly all the tracks from the band's early releases, including The Essential Kevorkian and Green World demos, the "Vans Song" single, and other demos and rare tracks. Several of the songs were re-recorded for the band's debut album Destruction by Definition in 1996 but appear here in early, rawer forms. It was the first release from Noise Riot, a label founded by Suicide Machines singer Jason Navarro. It was the band's final release, as they broke up the following year.

Track listing
All songs written by The Suicide Machines

Performers
Jason Navarro - vocals
Dan Lukacinsky - guitar
Jason Brake - bass
Dave Smith - bass (tracks 14-16)
Derek Grant - drums

Album information
Record label: Noise Riot Records
All songs written by The Suicide Machines
Mastered by Tim Pok
Art direction and design by Mark A. Penxa

References

The Suicide Machines albums
Noise Riot Records albums
2005 compilation albums